Wiltshire County Council (established in 1889) was the county council of Wiltshire in the South West of England, an elected local Government body responsible for most local government services in the county.

As a result of the 2009 restructuring of local government in some parts of England, the council was merged with four district councils into a new unitary authority for Wiltshire with effect from 1 April 2009. This was treated as a "continuing authority" and covers exactly the same area, although renamed "Wiltshire Council". At first almost all departments continued little changed, but after 2009 most services were substantially changed and relocated into fewer buildings around Wiltshire.

History
County Councils were first introduced in England and Wales with full powers from 22 September 1889 as a result of the Local Government Act 1888, taking over administrative functions until then carried out by the unelected Quarter Sessions. The areas they covered were termed administrative counties and were not in all cases identical to the traditional shire counties, but in Wiltshire the whole 'ceremonial county' came under the authority of the new council.

The first elections to the new county council were held on 23 January 1889, with sixty seats available, but only thirty-two of them were contested. Among those elected unopposed were the 4th Marquess of Bath, the 13th Earl of Pembroke, the 18th Earl of Suffolk, Sir Thomas Grove, 1st Baronet, M. P., Sir Charles Hobhouse, 4th Baronet, and Sir R. H. Pollen, Bart.

The first provisional meeting of the council was held at Devizes on 31 January 1889, with all of the members present, when Lord Bath was elected as chairman. Several voting aldermen were appointed, all from outside the elected members of the council.

In 1896 the County Council acquired Arlington House in The Parade in Trowbridge as a base for many of its employees; later extensions included a block of offices on land behind the building, completed in 1900, and another block of offices near the building completed in 1913.

Schools, both elementary and higher-grade, were added to the County Council's responsibilities by the Education Act 1902, which created local education authorities to replace the earlier School Boards. And until the 1990s the county council was also responsible for operating Colleges of Further Education.

In 1930, the members of the county council decided by 45 votes to 27 to build a new county hall in Devizes, which is near the geographical centre of Wiltshire, and not at Trowbridge, very near its western edge. However, construction was delayed, and in 1933 the decision was reversed in favour of Trowbridge, on the grounds that it was better served by rail services. A site of several acres was bought for £1,650 in Bythesea Road, Trowbridge, not far from the railway station, and the new County Hall, designed by Philip Dalton Hepworth, was begun in 1938 and finished in 1940 at a cost of £150,000. Between 1940 and 1943, the new building, built in a pale limestone, was seen as a potential landmark for German aircraft, so it was disguised by covering it with camouflage nets. In 1937, Wiltshire County Council was granted a coat of arms.

Throughout its existence, Wiltshire County Council was responsible for the more strategic local services of Wiltshire, with a changing pattern of lower-tier authorities existing alongside it within its area and responsible for other more local services, such as waste collection. Until 1974, Wiltshire had a large number of urban district and rural district councils. In 1974, local government was reorganised in England and Wales generally, and in Wiltshire dozens of former urban and rural districts were amalgamated into five district councils: Kennet, North Wiltshire, Salisbury, West Wiltshire and Thamesdown.

The council was controlled by the Conservatives from 2000 until 2009, and from 2005 was led by Jane Scott. She became the first leader of the new Wiltshire Council.

Position of Swindon

The Borough of Swindon, previously known as Thamesdown, remains part of the ceremonial county of Wiltshire. It was part of the county council's area from 1889 until 1997, when it was reorganised into a new single-tier unitary authority. This had the effect of taking almost one third of Wiltshire's population out of the administrative county. After 1997, Swindon was still treated as being part of Wiltshire for ceremonial purposes (for instance, it still shares a Lord Lieutenant), but the County Council no longer provided any local services in Swindon, so members were no longer elected to it from there.

Functions
By the time it was merged into the new Wiltshire Council unitary authority, Wiltshire County Council provided a wide range of services, including education, libraries, youth services, social services, highway maintenance, waste disposal, emergency planning, consumer protection and town and country planning for matters to do with minerals, waste, highways and education. This made it one of the largest employers in Wiltshire, with an annual budget in 2007 of some £300 million.

The working capital still employed by the Wiltshire Historic Buildings Trust originated in a single grant made by the County Council at the time of the Trust's foundation in 1967, funding which has been described by the Trust's President Lord Lansdowne as "a revolving capital sum".

Elections

Since 1889, members were elected for a term of office, with elections held all together (initially every three years, later every four years) on the "first past the post" system. Until the 1970s, the elected members chose aldermen, whose term of office was for six years, and who once appointed were also voting members of the council. This form of membership was ended by the Local Government Act 1972, so that after 1974 only honorary (that is, non-voting) aldermen could be appointed.

Until 2005, all of the county's electoral divisions elected a single member, but following a boundary review in 2004 three divisions (Salisbury South, Salisbury East, and Trowbridge East) elected two members each. The final size of the council was forty-nine members. The successor authority, Wiltshire Council, was established in 2009 with a total of ninety-eight members.
1889 Wiltshire County Council election
1973 Wiltshire County Council election
1977 Wiltshire County Council election
1981 Wiltshire County Council election
1985 Wiltshire County Council election
1989 Wiltshire County Council election
1993 Wiltshire County Council election
1997 Wiltshire County Council election
2001 Wiltshire County Council election
2005 Wiltshire County Council election

Political control

At its end in 2009, the council consisted of thirty Conservatives, fourteen Liberal Democrats, three Labour Party members and two Independents. The Conservatives held most of the more rural areas while the Liberal Democrats held several towns, including Trowbridge, Chippenham and Bradford-on-Avon. The divisions of Westbury Ham & Dilton Marsh and Holt & Paxcroft (both mixed urban and rural areas) elected the two Independents, while the three Labour members held their seats in the city of Salisbury and the towns of Melksham and Devizes.

History of political control
May 1973 to May 1985: Conservative
May 1985 to May 1989:  No overall control, Liberal/SDP minority administration with tacit Labour support
May 1989 to May 1993: No overall control, informal cross-party administration between the Conservative Party, Liberal Democrats and Labour Party
May 1993 to April 1997: No overall control, minority Liberal Democrat administration
April 1997 to May 1997: Liberal Democrat
May 1997 to May 1998: No overall control, with Liberal Democrat and Labour administration
May 1998 to January 2000: No overall control, with Conservative and Independent administration
January 2000 to 2009: Conservative

2009 changes

Wiltshire's previous "two tier" system of local government was typical of English shire counties, with the area it covered being sub-divided (since the separation of Swindon) into four local government districts. However, the Department for Communities and Local Government announced on 25 July 2007 that with effect from 1 April 2009 Wiltshire would be served by a new unitary authority, replacing the county council and the four district councils.

Wiltshire County Council was designated as a "continuing authority", so that it would inherit existing contracts without a break,  and its 48 outgoing county councillors remained in office until the 4 June 2009 elections, whereas the district councillors ceased to hold office on 31 March 2009.

Chairmen
See List of chairmen of Wiltshire County Council.

List of notable members

Jack Ainslie 1964–1993 (chairman, 1986–1990)
Fleur de Rhé-Philipe 1997–2009
Sir Richard Hungerford Pollen, 4th Baronet (elected 1889)
Francis Edward Newman Rogers 1894–1911 (also member of parliament for Devizes 1906–1910)
Mary Salisbury 1963–2001 (not continuous) (chairman, 1990–1993)
Jane Scott, Baroness Scott of Bybrook, 1997–2009 (leader, 2003–2009)
Sir Geoffrey Ernest Tritton, 3rd Baronet 1950s
Earl of Shelburne, later 9th Marquess of Lansdowne 1970–1985
Henry Howard, 18th Earl of Suffolk (el. 1889)
Robert Syms 1985–1997 (member of parliament for Poole since 1997)
Group Captain Frank Willan 1961–1981 (chairman, 1973–1979)
R. S. A. Williams 1945–1952 (previously member of parliament for Sevenoaks)
Percy Wyndham (early 20th century, also a member of parliament)

Clerks of the County Council
From the outset, the most significant employee of the council was the clerk of the council, a new office which was held jointly with the position of Clerk of the Peace to the Wiltshire Quarter Sessions until the latter was abolished in 1971.

In 1973 the last clerk of the council, R. P. Harries, became the first chief executive.

1889–1912: Robert William Merriman
1912–1940: William Langsdale Bown
1940–1960: Philip Austin Selborne Stringer
1960–1973: Robert Paschal Harries

Chief executives
1973–1984: Robert Paschal Harries
1984–1996: Ian Andrew Browning
1996–2009: Dr Keith Robinson

Other notable officers
Will Hodgman (born 1969), later Premier of Tasmania

See also
Wiltshire Council
2009 Wiltshire Council election

References

Bibliography
K. H. Rogers. Wiltshire County Council: The First Hundred Years (Trowbridge: WCC, 1989)

 
Local government in Wiltshire
Former county councils of England